Lalit Mohan Singh Pharswan is an Indian politician from Uttarakhand and a one term Member of the Uttarakhand Legislative Assembly. Pharswan represented the Kapkot Assembly constituency from 2012 to 2017. Pharswan is a member of the Indian National Congress.

Lalit Pharswan was defeated in the 2022 Uttarakhand Legislative Assembly election by Suresh Gariya of Bhartiya Janata Party by a margin of 4046 votes.

Positions held

Elections contested

References

External links 

2012 Election

2017 Election

Living people
20th-century Indian politicians
Indian National Congress politicians from Uttarakhand
Uttarakhand politicians
Year of birth missing (living people)
Uttarakhand MLAs 2012–2017